Vietnam is a southeast Asian country, and is the easternmost country of mainland Southeast Asia. It borders the East Sea, hence, seeing the increased likeliness of tropical cyclones. Tropical cyclones in this area are considered to be part of the Northwest Pacific basin, and therefore, storms here are considered as typhoons.

Climatologically, in the Northwest Pacific basin, most tropical cyclones tend to develop between May and October. Typhoons impacting this region are relatively common, with most of these storms doing so from the middle of the year. The most active tropical cyclone season for Vietnam is in 2013, with their meteorological agency tracking 15 storms, in which 9 have made landfall. This article includes any tropical cyclone of any intensity that affected Vietnam.

Background 
Vietnam recognises its typhoon season from the beginning of June through to the end of November, with an average of four to six typhoons hitting the country annually. Any tropical cyclones here are monitored by the National Center for Hydro-Meteorological Forecasting (NCHMF), which is the nation's official meteorological agency and was established in January 2003. The NCHMF tracks a storm should it enter the agency's monitoring area range which is within the East Sea to the west of 120°E and north of 5°N. Any storm that enters this area is assigned a number, and is set according to its sequence of its occurrence – as for instance with Bão số 1 etc., which translates to "Storm no. 1". Bão comes from "暴', meaning ferocious, violent or vicious, but in vernacular Vietnamese has come to mean "storm".

A study was investigated in the correlation of rainfall and tropical cyclones during El Niño and La Niña seasons, and showed that there is an increase of rainfall and tropical cyclones during La Niña seasons.

Events

1800s
October 5, 1881 - A typhoon struck what is now northern Vietnam, producing a storm surge that flooded the city of Hai Phong, killing around 3,000 people.

1900s
November 2, 1997 - Tropical Storm Linda struck southern Vietnam, where it wrecked thousands of fishing boats and killed at least 3,111 people.

2000s 
August 7, 2008 — Tropical Storm Kammuri (Bão số 4) moved over the extreme northern provinces of Vietnam, killing 127 people in total, with 34 people missing due to flooding and landslides. 
September 24, 2008 — Typhoon Hagupit (Bão số 6) brought heavy flooding which killed 41 people in total and left damages of about 
September 29, 2008 — Tropical Storm Mekkhala (Bão số 7) caused flooding, especially which caused about 3,050 hectares of crops bring damaged in the Thanh Hóa Province.
October 15, 2008 — Tropical Depression 22W affected Central Vietnam which little to no reported damages.
November 17, 2008 — Tropical Storm Noul moved over the central provinces which brought agricultural damages.
A tornado was also seen from the storm.
September 3, 2009 — a tropical depression and its outer rainbands led to heavy rainfall throughout central Vietnam, peaking at 430 mm (17 in). Widespread flooding caused economic and agricultural losses of 45 billion (VND; US$2.52 million).
September 11, 2009 — Tropical Depression Mujigae (Bão số 7) passes through Northern Vietnam.
September 29, 2009 — Typhoon Ketsana (Bão số 9) brought flash flooding over much of Vietnam. The typhoon killed 179 people, with damages of 16.07 trillion VND (US$896.1 million).
October 13, 2009 — Tropical Storm Parma (Bão số 10) made landfall over Hai Phong. 62 fishing boats sank due to rough waves.
November 2, 2009 — Typhoon Mirinae (Bão số 11) brought torrential rainfall which triggered flooding and landslides, killing 124 people. Roughly 2,400 homes were destroyed by swift currents and 437,300 hectares of crops were flooded. Damage was counted as 5.8 trillion đồng (US$323 million).

2010s 
January 20, 2010 — Tropical Depression 01W made landfall over Gò Công. Only as a weak system, rough waves caused three people to die.
August 24, 2010 — Tropical Storm Mindulle (Bão số 3) brought widespread flooding, with at least 10 people bring killed and losses reaching ₫850 billion (US$43.3 million).
November 14, 2010 — Tropical Depression 18W made landfall near Da Nang.
June 25, 2011 – Tropical Storm Haima (Bão số 2) moved over Hanoi as a weakening system.
July 30, 2011 — Tropical Storm Nock-ten (Bão số 3) affected north-central Vietnam with 6,200 acres of rice and other crop fields were reported to be completely submerged due to flooding. 20 people have died from the storm.
September 26, 2011 — Tropical Storm Haitang (Bão số 4) affected the central provinces of Vietnam, killing 25 people.
September 30, 2011 — Tropical Storm Nesat (Bão số 5) hit the northern provinces of Vietnam, causing 4,000 people to evacuate in the Nam Định province.

April 1, 2012 — Tropical Storm Pakhar (Bão số 1) affected the southern provinces of Vietnam, making landfall near Vũng Tàu. The storm destroyed about 4,400 homes in the district.
August 17, 2012 — Tropical Storm Kai-tak (Bão số 5) moved over the northern provinces of Vietnam as a strong tropical storm.
October 6, 2012 — Tropical Storm Gaemi (Bão số 7) made landfall over Tuy Hòa bringing heavy rainfall.
October 28, 2012 — Typhoon Son-Tinh (Bão số 8) brushed the northeastern coast of Vietnam as a Category 3-equivalent typhoon before making landfall over northern Vietnam. The typhoon brought gusty winds.
November 14, 2012 — Tropical Depression 25W moved over Southern Vietnam with minor impacts.
June 23, 2013 — Tropical Storm Bebinca (Bão số 2) made landfall to the east of Hanoi. Around 4,600 hectares (11,000 acres) of marine ponds were destroyed by the storm.
August 3, 2013 — Tropical Storm Jebi (Bão số 5) affected the Quang Ninh province, killing 6 people.
August 7, 2013 — Tropical Storm Mangkhut (Bão số 6) brought heavy rainfall over the northern provinces of Vietnam, with rainfall reaching up to 300 mm (12 in) in central Thanh Hóa province.
September 18, 2013 — Tropical Depression 18W (Bão số 8) brought widespread rainfall and flooding across much of the country. Total damage in Vietnam reached 817.91 billion dong (US$35.6 million), and a total of 28 people being killed. The province of Hà Tĩnh also experienced a tornado.
September 30, 2013 — Typhoon Wutip (Bão số 10) made landfall over the Quảng Bình Province as a weakening Category 2-equivalent typhoon. Overall 13 people were killed, and total damage was estimated at ₫13.6 trillion (US$644 million).
October 14, 2013 — Typhoon Nari (Bão số 11) hit the central provinces of Vietnam as a strong Category 1-equivalent typhoon.
November 6, 2013 — Tropical Depression 30W (Bão số 13) brought minor impacts over the south-central areas of the country.
November 10, 2013 — Typhoon Haiyan (Bão số 14) brought widespread rainfall and gusty winds over Northern Vietnam. The typhoon killed 18 people, and left two missing with 93 others being injured. Economic losses in Vietnam were amounted to ₫669 billion (US$31.67 million).
November 14, 2013 — Tropical Storm Podul (Bão số 15) brought heavy rainfall. Throughout Vietnam, Podul killed 44 people and injured 74 others.
July 19, 2014 — Typhoon Rammasun (Bão số 2) only affected the extreme northern provinces of Vietnam, despite not making landfall. Some provinces were put on high alert for flash floods and landslides. 31 people died from the storm due to flooding and landslides.
September 17, 2014 — Typhoon Kalmaegi (Bão số 3) brought heavy rainfall and gusty winds over the northern portion of the country.
November 29, 2014 — Tropical Storm Sinlaku (Bão số 4) only affected Central Vietnam.
June 24, 2015 — Tropical Storm Kujira (Bão số 1) impacted northern Vietnam.  of rain was recorded for a two-day period.
September 14, 2015 — Tropical Storm Vamco made landfall in the Quảng Nam Province, killing 11 people due to heavy rainfall.
July 27, 2016 — Tropical Storm Mirinae (Bão số 1) made landfall over Northern Vietnam in Thái Bình. The storm brought rainfall with precipitation exceeding  in the Tam Đảo District. Only 7 people died with damages of up to ₫7.229 trillion ($323.9 million).
August 19, 2016 — Tropical Storm Dianmu (Bão số 3) affected the northern provinces of Vietnam, killing 17 people.
September 12, 2016 — Tropical Storm Rai (Bão số 4) made landfall in the Quảng Nam Province, where heavy rain caused flooding and the bursting of the Bung River 2 hydroelectricity plant. Only 14 people died from the storm.
October 13, 2016 — Tropical Storm Aere made landfall over Huế.
November 5, 2016 — A tropical depression caused heavy rainfall and flooding over the central and southern provinces of the nation. It is said that it has seen the worst flooding in 5 years at that time.
December 12, 2016 — Another tropical depression brought heavy rainfall and flooding in the same area as the previous depression. 31 people perished from the system with damages of about ₫1.21 trillion (US$53.4 million).
July 17, 2017 — Tropical Storm Talas (Bão số 2) made landfall over Nghệ An Province. The storm left 14 people dead and damaged around 2,700 houses.
July 25, 2017 — Tropical Storm Sonca (Bão số 4) moved over Central Vietnam, leaving six people died.
September 15, 2017 — Typhoon Doksuri (Bão số 10) impacted Vietnam and was considered as the "most powerful storm in a decade". Total damages from the typhoon reached ₫18.4 trillion (US$809 million).
September 25, 2017 — Tropical Depression 22W made landfall over Quảng Ninh.
October 10, 2017 — Tropical Depression 23W made landfall over Hà Tĩnh Province. Despite its weak intensity, the system brought extensive damages and several landslides. In total, 100 people were killed and damages reached over 13 trillion ₫ (US$572 million).

November 3, 2017 — Typhoon Damrey (Bão số 12) made landfall over Central Vietnam and affected the 2017 APEC Summit in Da Nang. 107 people died from the typhoon and caused damages of up to 22 trillion VND (US$1 billion).
November 18, 2017 — Tropical Storm Kirogi (Bão số 14) affected the central provinces of the country as a weakening system, causing only US$10 million worth of damages. 
December 25, 2017 — Tropical Storm Tembin (Bão số 16) affected the southernmost parts of the country, bringing only moderate rainfall.
July 19, 2018 — Tropical Storm Son-Tinh (Bão số 3) caused extensive rainfall over Northern Vietnam. 35 people were killed, more than 5,000 houses, 82,000 hectares (200,000 acres) of crops, and 17,000 farm animals were either swept away, submerged, or otherwise destroyed.
August 17, 2018 — Tropical Storm Bebinca (Bão số 4) brought strong winds and heavy rainfall which resulted in several mudslides over the northern portion of the country. 10 people were killed by the storm.
November 17, 2018 — Tropical Storm Toraji (Bão số 8) brought heavy flooding throughout the southern portion of the country. A report a few months after the storm stated that a total of 20 people have died, with total damages measured at ₫1.24 billion (US$53.9 million).
November 25, 2018 — Tropical Storm Usagi (Bão số 9) caused heavy flooding over Southern Vietnam. Tân Bình District recorded  of rain, surpassing the district's record of most rainfall. Losses were estimated at ₫925 billion (US$39.8 million).
July 3, 2019 — Tropical Storm Mun (Bão số 2) only affected the extreme northern portion of the country. A bridge in Tĩnh Gia District was damaged by the storm, which killed 2 people and left 3 injured. Damages of the storm were 98 billion VND ($4.25 million).
August 3, 2019 — Tropical Storm Wipha (Bão số 3) also affected the northern portion of the country. 15 people were killed by the storm, with 1.18 trillion VND ($48 million) in damages.
August 29, 2019 — Tropical Storm Podul (Bão số 4) brought rainfall which killed 4 and caused damages worth 393 billion VND ($12.3 million).
September 2, 2019 — Tropical Storm Kajiki brought heavy rainfall and flash flooding. 10 people died from the storm and total losses worth 1.76 trillion VND ($76.2 million).
October 31, 2019 — Tropical Storm Matmo (Bão số 5) destroyed 2,700 houses and 35 schools, causing 912 billion VND (US$39.8 million) in damage in Vietnam, with majority of losses in two provinces: Quảng Ngãi and Bình Định. The storm also killed two people in the country.
November 10, 2019 — Tropical Storm Nakri (Bão số 6) made landfall over central Vietnam as a weakening storm, killing 2 and causing 318 billion VND ($13.9 million) in damage.

2020s 
August 2, 2020 — Tropical Storm Sinlaku moved over the northern provinces of the nation. Two people died from the storm, with total damages estimating about 300 billion đồng (US$12.94 million).
September 18, 2020 — Tropical Storm Noul made landfall between the provinces of Quảng Trị and Thừa Thiên-Huế. Heavy precipitation amounts peaking at 310 mm (12.20 inches) fell in Da Nang. The storm caused 6 deaths and 705 billion đồng (US$30.4 million) in damage.
During 2020 Central Vietnam flood, the region suffered more than 36,000 billion VND ($1.58 billion) of damages.
October 11, 2020
October 25, 2020
October 28, 2020
November 5, 2020
November 9, 2020
November 14, 2020
June 12, 2021 — Tropical Storm Koguma brought heavy downpour over the northern provinces of Vietnam. About ₫2.4 billion (US$104,000).
September 12, 2021 — Tropical Storm Conson brought rainfall and flooding over central Vietnam. Estimated damages were around ₫100 billion (US$4.3 million), while two people have died.
September 23, 2021 — Tropical Storm Dianmu made landfall over Thua Thien Hue province. Two people drowned in Tuy Phuoc district, Binh Dinh.
October 26, 2021 — Tropical Depression 26W brought heavy rainfall, especially in Thua Thien - Hue to Khanh Hoa, which were the provinces that seen to receive heavy rainfall.
September 28, 2022 — Typhoon Noru makes landfall in the city of Da Nang with strong gusts and heavy rain. Power outage happened in both Thua Thien - Hue and Da Nang. Flooding occurred in Quảng Nam which border next to Da Nang.

Climatology

Deadliest storms 
The following list are the ten deadliest storms that impacted Vietnam. Total number of deaths recorded are only from the country itself.

See also 

Typhoon
 Pacific typhoon season

References

External links 
 Vietnam's National Hydro-Meteorological Service

Geography of Vietnam
Lists of events in Vietnam
Vietnam